The Second Amendment of the Constitution of India, officially known as The Constitution (Second Amendment) Act, 1952, removed the upper population limit for a parliamentary constituency by amending Article 81(1)(b) of the Constitution. Article 81(1)(b) had stipulated that the number of members to be allotted to each parliamentary constituency should be determined so as to ensure that there would be not less than one member for every 750,000 of the population and not more than one member for every 500,000 of the population.

Full Text

The full text of sub-clauses (a) and (b) of clause (1) of Article 81, after the 2nd Amendment, is given below:

Proposal and enactment
The bill of The Constitution (Second Amendment) Act, 1952 was introduced in the Lok Sabha on 18 June 1952, as the Constitution (Second Amendment) Bill, 1952 (Bill No. 54 of 1952). It was introduced by C.C. Biswas, then Minister of Law and Minority Affairs. The bill sought to amend Article 81 of the Constitution. The full text of the Statement of Objects and Reasons appended to the bill is given below:

The bill was debated by the Lok Sabha on 18 June, 8 and 9 July, and 11 and 18 November 1952. A motion to refer the bill to a Select Committee of the House was moved and adopted on 11 November 1952. The Select Committee presented its Report to the House on 18 November. The bill, as recommended by the Committee, was then considered by the Lok Sabha on 9, 10 and 15 December. The House passed the bill on 15 December 1952. The bill was then debated by the Rajya Sabha on 15 and 18 December, and passed on 19 December 1952.

The bill received assent from then President Rajendra Prasad on 1 May 1953, and came into force on the same date. It was notified in The Gazette of India on 2 May 1953.

See also 
 List of amendments of the Constitution of India

References

02
1952 in India
1952 in law
Nehru administration